Charly Records is a British record label that specialises in reissued material.

Among the labels whose original releases are reissued by Charly are Vee-Jay, Sun, Immediate, BYG, Tomato, and Fania.

History
Charly Records was founded in France in 1974 by Jean-Luc Young, who had been a promoter of teen concerts but moved to the UK in 1975. Charly was originally known mainly for American-originated jazz and other modern oddities, such as the Bollock Brothers, but it is now mainly an album-oriented "retro" label.  Its most obvious rivals are Rhino and See for Miles (a label that Charly distributed in the 1980s).

In Europe, Charly is distributed by Snapper Records, while licensing is through LicenseMusic.com.

The label produces Americana, blues, funk, gospel, jazz, Latin, popular, rap, reggae, r&b, rock, rockabilly, soul, and ska.

Roster

Johnny Cash
Sammy Davis, Jr.
Funkadelic
Mickey Gilley
Rosco Gordon
Charlie Gracie
Carol Grimes
Hardrock Gunter
Gong
Bill Haley & His Comets
Ronnie Hawkins
John Lee Hooker
Ice-T
Elmore James
Jerry Lee Lewis
Billy Lee Riley
Curtis Mayfield
Thelonious Monk
Moon Mullican
Johnny Pacheco
Soft Heap
Small Faces
Alvin "Shine" Robinson
Warren Smith
The Staple Singers
Gene Summers
Sylvia Striplin
Showaddywaddy
Toots & the Maytals
Sonny Boy Williamson and the Yardbirds
13th Floor Elevators
The Red Crayola

See also
List of record labels

References

External links
 Charly Records website
 Charly discography

Charly Records artists
British independent record labels
Record labels established in 1974
Blues record labels
Rhythm and blues record labels
Gospel music record labels
Jazz record labels
Reggae record labels
Ska record labels
Rock and roll record labels
British country music record labels
Reissue record labels